Masone ( or  ) is a comune (municipality) in the Metropolitan City of Genoa in the Italian region Liguria, located about  northwest of Genoa. 

Masone borders the following municipalities: Bosio, Campo Ligure, Genoa, Mele, Tiglieto.

See also 
 Bric del Dente
 Stura di Ovada
 Cascata del Serpente

References

Cities and towns in Liguria